"Un Beso" is Aventura's third single from their fourth studio album, God's Project. The song received airplay in Spanish-speaking countries, reaching number six on the Billboard Hot Latin Songs chart and number 36 on the Billboard Regional Mexican Airplay chart. It was later included on the compilation album Bachata Romántica: 1's (2009).

Music video
The music video for "Un Beso" shows Romeo sitting down in a club when he sees this girl dancing. He walks up to her, and then they start dancing, and then they share a kiss. They fall in love after the kiss, and leave the club to go on a cruise then they share another kiss.

Charts

Weekly charts

Year-end charts

References

2005 singles
Aventura (band) songs
Songs written by Romeo Santos
2005 songs